Pakistan Squash Federation (PSF) is the National governing body for Squash in Pakistan. The Federation was formed in 1950.

Affiliations
The Federation is affiliated with:

 World Squash Federation
 Asian Squash Federation
 Pakistan Olympic Association
 Pakistan Sports Board

See also
 Pakistan men's national squash team

References

External links
Official site

Squash in Pakistan
Sports governing bodies in Pakistan
National members of the World Squash Federation
Sports organizations established in 1950
1950 establishments in Pakistan